Napoleón Medina (26 November 1919 – 24 February 2005) was an Ecuadorian footballer. He played in 14 matches for the Ecuador national football team from 1942 to 1947. He was also part of Ecuador's squad for the 1945 South American Championship.

References

1919 births
2005 deaths
Ecuadorian footballers
Ecuador international footballers
Place of birth missing
Association football goalkeepers